Pachnodus is a genus of air-breathing land snails, terrestrial pulmonate gastropod mollusks in the family Cerastidae.

Distribution 
The genus Pachnodus is endemic to the Seychelles.

Species
Species within the genus Pachnodus include:

subgenus Pachnodus
 Pachnodus becketti Gerlach, 1994
 Pachnodus leroyi Bourguignat, 1890 
 Pachnodus lionneti Von Mol & Coppois, 1980
 Pachnodus niger (Dufo, 1840)
 Pachnodus niger niger (Dufo, 1840)
 Pachnodus niger subfuscus Gerlach, 1994
 † Pachnodus velutinus (Pfeiffer, 1942)
 Pachnodus niger × velutinus
 Pachnodus sesamorum Bourguignat, 1890 

subgenus Nesiocerastus
 Pachnodus fregatensis Von Mol & Coppois, 1980
 Pachnodus kantilali Von Mol & Coppois, 1980
 Pachnodus ornatus (Dufo, 1840)
 Pachnodus ornatus var. biornatus 
 Pachnodus oxoniensis Gerlach, 1994
 Pachnodus praslinus Gerlach, 1990
 Pachnodus silbouettanus Von Mol & Coppois, 1980

References

Cerastidae
Taxonomy articles created by Polbot